Oghenekowhoyan Onaibe Desmond is a Nigerian comedian. He won the best comedian award organized by Cheq TV in 2021 and he was also among the comedian nominated for Ugelli's Maiden Concert same year.

Career 
Destalker in an interview disclosed he once worked as an undertaker before going into the comedy industry. He is famous for his Destalker Laughter Crusade.

Awards and nominations

References

Living people
Nigerian comedians
Year of birth missing (living people)